Alison Lang (born 28 June 1961) is a Canadian basketball player. She won a bronze medal at the 1979 Pan American Games, and also competed in the women's tournament at the 1984 Summer Olympics. Until January 2020, she was the leading points scorer for the Oregon Ducks, with 2,252 points.

References

External links
 

1961 births
Living people
Basketball people from Saskatchewan
Canadian women's basketball players
Olympic basketball players of Canada
Basketball players at the 1984 Summer Olympics
Sportspeople from Saskatoon
Basketball players at the 1979 Pan American Games
Pan American Games bronze medalists for Canada
Pan American Games medalists in basketball
Medalists at the 1979 Pan American Games